"Do They Know It's Hallowe'en?" is a charity record  inspired by "Do They Know It's Christmas?".  It was released on October 11, 2005, in Canada on Vice Records by a cast of rock artists and other performers under the name "North American Halloween Prevention Initiative" (NAHPI). It reached number four on the Canada pop chart.

It was written by Nick Diamonds and Adam Gollner. Like its inspiration, it is a charity song, with all proceeds being donated to UNICEF. According to the official press release, the song "stems from a frustration with other benefit songs' misguided, somewhat patronizing attitude, and Western-centric worldview."

Contributors
Win Butler & Régine Chassagne of Arcade Fire
Beck
Buck 65
David Cross
Liane Balaban of Dessert
Devendra Banhart (with Noah Georgeson, Jona Bechtolt & Luckey Remington)
Elvira, Mistress of the Dark
Feist
Gino Washington
Syd Butler of Les Savy Fav
J'aime Tambeur of Islands
Malcolm McLaren
Nardwuar the Human Serviette
Peaches
Dntel
Jenny Lewis & Blake Sennett of Rilo Kiley
Roky Erickson
Chris Murphy of Sloan
Asya & Chloe of Chaos Chaos
Stephin Merritt of The Magnetic Fields
Thurston Moore of Sonic Youth
Russell Mael of Sparks
Subtitle
Steve Jocz of Sum 41
Tanya Tagaq
Anna Waronker of That Dog
Dan Boeckner & Spencer Krug of Wolf Parade
Karen O of Yeah Yeah Yeahs

NAHPI band
Adam Gollner of We Are Molecules - guitar
Nick Diamonds of Islands - keyboards
Steve McDonald of Redd Kross - bass
Joey Waronker - drums
 music & words by Nick Diamonds and Adam Gollner
 produced by Steven "Deadd Kross" McDonald, Adam "Ghoulner" Gollner, & Nick "Diamonds" Thorburn
 mixed by Danny Kalb at The Boat, Los Angeles, CA
 NAHPI band recorded by Steve McDonald at his studio in Los Angeles, California

Additional vocal engineers: Jamie Thompson (Gino's kitchen, Detroit), Cornelius Rapp (Studio Rapp, Berlin), Raf Katigbak (Studio 264, Manila), Greig Nori (bunkrock, Toronto), John Collins (JCDC, Vancouver), Russell Mael (Sparks' studio, Los Angeles), Danny Kalb (The Boat, Los Angeles), Mark Lawson (the White House, Casablanca), Stuart Sullivan (Wire Studios, Austin), Donn Devore (Avast! II, Seattle), Jona Becholt (VW camper, Estonia), Jay Ferguson (Jay's basement, Halifax), Matthew Illachewizch (Cambridge Bay Radio Station, Nunavut)

 choral leader: Anna Waronker
 additional throat singing: Tagaq
 additional sound effects: Régine Chassagne
 artwork & design by Nick Diamonds

track 3 remixed by Disco D at the Booty Barn, Brasil.

track 4 remixed by Th' Corn Gangg at Jamie's, Montreal.

Track listing
 "Do They Know It's Halloween?" - (5:58)
 "Do They Know It's Halloween? (Radio Edit)" - (3:35)
 "Do They Know It's Halloween? (Disco D Remix)" - (3:48)
 "Do They Know It's Halloween? (Th' Corn Gangg Remix)" - (4:54) [listed as "6:66" on the back of the case]

References

External links
 

2005 songs
Charity singles
All-star recordings
Halloween songs
UNICEF